The 1977–78 British Ice Hockey season featured the Northern League for teams from Scotland and the north of England and the Southern League for teams from the rest of England. 

Fife Flyers won the Northern League and Solihull Barons won the Southern League. Fife Flyers won the Icy Smith Cup.

Northern League

Regular season

Southern League

Regular season

Midland Section

(*Played all games away for four points per match.)

Southern Section

(*Played all games away for four points per match.)

Final
Solihull Barons defeated Blackpool Seagulls 11:4 on aggregate (6:4, 5:0)

Spring Cup

Final
Won by the Murrayfield Racers

Icy Smith Cup

Final
Fife Flyers defeated Southampton Vikings 13-0 & 10-5

Autumn Cup

References

British
1977 in English sport
1978 in English sport
1977 in Scottish sport
1978 in Scottish sport